The 1993 Hong Kong Open in badminton was held in the Queen Elizabeth Stadium, Wanchai, Hong Kong, from November 15 to November 21, with a prize of USD$ 60,000.

Results

Men's singles

Women's singles

Men's doubles

Women's doubles

Mixed doubles

External links
Smash: 1993 Hong Kong Open Results

Hong Kong Open (badminton)
Hong Kong Open